Schoonmaker is a surname. Notable people with the surname include:

Martinus Schoonmaker (1737-1824), a Dutch clergyman of New York
Augustus Schoonmaker, Jr. (1828-1894), New York State Attorney General from 1877 to 1879
Cornelius Corneliusen Schoonmaker (1745-1796), American politician
Frank Schoonmaker (1905-1976), American wine writer and wine merchant
James Martinus Schoonmaker, (1842-1927), railroad executive
Marius Schoonmaker (1811–1894), American politician, grandson of Cornelius
Thelma Schoonmaker (born in 1940), film editor

Occupational surnames
Dutch-language surnames